The Filmfare Best Actor Award is given by the Filmfare as part of its annual Filmfare Awards South for Tamil film lead actors. The Filmfare Awards South Awards were extended to "Best Actor" in 1972. The year indicates the year of release of the film.

Superlatives 

 Kamal Haasan with ten wins, has most number of awards than any other actor. Vikram has five wins, followed by Karthik and Dhanush with four wins. Four actors have won the award thrice in chronological order they are Sivaji Ganesan, Sarath Kumar Ajith Kumar and Suriya. Actors Sivakumar and Vijay Sethupathi has two wins each.
 Vikram, Dhanush, Karthi, Suriya and R. Madhavan are the five actors to win both Filmfare Award for Best Actor – Tamil and Filmfare Critics Award for Best Actor and Vikram is the first actor to win this honour.
 Sathyaraj, Suriya and R. Madhavan have won both Filmfare Award for Best Actor – Tamil and Filmfare Award for Best Supporting Actor – Tamil.
 Kamal Hassan was the most victorious actor with four wins in the 70s. Karthik ruled the 80s with two wins. In the 90s, Kamal Haasan outperformed every other actors with four wins. Vikram was the most successful actor with three wins in the 2000s. Dhanush was the most successful actor in the 2010s with four wins.
 Seven actors have won the awards in consecutive years; in chronological order, they are Sivaji Ganesan (1972–1973), Kamal Haasan (1975–1978, 1991–1992 and 1995–1996), Sivakumar (1979–1980), Karthik (1988–1990), Sarathkumar (1997–1998), Dhanush (2011–2012) and Vijay Sethupathi (2017–2018).
 Suriya and R. Madhavan are the two actors to have won Filmfare Awards South in three major actor categories : Best Actor, Best Supporting Actor, Best Actor Critics which was achieved by them as of 2016 & 2017 respectively.
 R. Madhavan became the first actor and the only actor to have won Filmfare Awards South in four different acting categories: Best Actor, Best Supporting Actor, Best Actor critics and Best Male Debut awards once each.
 There was only one tie in 2018 between Dhanush and Vijay Sethupathi.
 Karthi was the only actor to win the award for his debut performance in Tamil.
 Kamal Haasan has a most nominations with 33, followed by Rajinikanth with 18.

Multiple wins 
 10 Wins: Kamal Haasan
 5 Wins: Vikram
 4 Wins: Karthik, Dhanush
 3 Wins: Sivaji Ganesan, Sarath Kumar, Ajith Kumar, Suriya Sivakumar
 2 Wins: Sivakumar, Vijay Sethupathi.

Multiple Nominations 
Multiple nominations :
 33 nominations :Kamal Haasan
 18 nominations :Rajinikanth
 14 nominations : Suriya Sivakumar, Ajith Kumar
 11 nominations :Dhanush
 10 nominations :Sivaji Ganesan, Vikram,
 8 nominations:Vijay
 6 nominatiins :Sivakumar, Bhagyaraj, Vijayakanth, Karthik
 5 nominations :Mohan, Karthi
 4 nominations :M. G. Ramachandran, Sathyaraj, Prabhu, Madhavan, Jayam Ravi, Sarath Kumar, Arvind Swami
 3 nominations :Arya, Vijay Sethupathi
 :2 nominations :Jiiva, Silambarasan, Prakashraj, Arjun Sarja, Vijayakumar, Sudhakar, Narain

Winners

Nominations

1970s 
 1972 Sivaji Ganesan – Gnana Oli
 1973 Sivaji Ganesan – Gauravam
 1974 Gemini Ganesan – Naan Avan Illai
 M. G. Ramachandran – Urimai Kural
 Sivaji Ganesan – Thanga Pathakkam
 1975 Kamal Haasan – Apoorva Raagangal
 M. G. Ramachandran – Idhayakkani
 Sivaji Ganesan – Vaira Nenjam
 1976 Kamal Haasan – Oru Oodhappu Kan Simittugiradhu
 Jaishankar – Thunive Thunai
 M. G. Ramachandran – Needhikku Thalaivanangu
 Sivaji Ganesan – Chitra Pournami
 Sivakumar – Annakili
 1977 Kamal Haasan – 16 Vayathinile
 Kamal Haasan – Avargal
 M. G. Ramachandran – Navarathinam
 Sivaji Ganesan – Dheepam
 Sivakumar – Aattukara Alamelu
 1978 Kamal Haasan – Sigappu Rojakkal
 Kamal Haasan – Ilamai Oonjal Aadukirathu
 Rajinikanth – Mullum Malarum
 Sivaji Ganesan – Thyagam
 Sudhakar – Kizhakke Pogum Rail
 1979 Sivakumar – Rosappu Ravikkaikari
 Kamal Haasan – Ninaithale Inikkum
 Pratap Pothen – Azhiyatha Kolangal
 Rajinikanth – Aarilirunthu Arubathu Varai
 Vijayan – Uthiri Pookkal

1980s 
 1980 Sivakumar – Vandichakkaram
 Kamal Haasan – Varumayin Niram Sigappu
 Pratap Pothen – Nenjathai Killathe
 Rajinikanth – Johnny
 Sudhakar – Kallukkul Eeram
 1981 Kamal Haasan – Raja Paarvai
 Bhagyaraj – Andha 7 Naatkal
 Karthik – Alaigal Oivathillai
 Rajinikanth – Thillu Mullu
 Suresh – Panneer Pushpangal
 1982 Mohan – Payanangal Mudivathillai
 Kamal Haasan – Moondram Pirai
 Kamal Haasan – Vaazhve Mayam
 Rajinikanth – Moondru Mugam
 Sivakumar – Agni Sakshi
 1983 Bhagyaraj – Mundhanai Mudichu
 Pandiyan – Mann Vasanai
 Sivaji Ganesan – Imaigal
 T. Rajendar – Thangaikkor Geetham
 Thiagarajan – Malaiyoor Mambattiyan
 1984 Rajinikanth – Nallavanukku Nallavan
 Mohan – Nooravathu Naal
 Rajesh – Achamillai Achamillai
 Sivaji Ganesan – Vaazhkai
 Vijayakanth – Vaidehi Kathirunthal
 1985 Sivaji Ganesan – Muthal Mariyathai
 Bhagyaraj – Chinna Veedu
 Kamal Haasan – Oru Kaidhiyin Diary
 Mohan – Idaya Kovil
 Sivakumar – Sindhu Bhairavi
 1986 Vijayakanth – Amman Kovil Kizhakale
 Kamal Haasan – Punnagai Mannan
 Mohan – Mouna Ragam
 Prabhu – Aruvadai Naal
 Visu – Samsaram Adhu Minsaram
 1987 Sathyaraj – Vedham Pudhithu
 Bhagyaraj – Enga Chinna Rasa
 Kamal Haasan – Nayakan
 Mohan – Rettai Vaal Kuruvi
 Rajinikanth – Velaikaran
 1988 Karthik – Agni Natchathiram
 Kamal Haasan – Unnal Mudiyum Thambi
 Prabhu – Agni Natchathiram
 Sathyaraj – En Bommukutty Ammavukku
 Vijayakanth – Poonthotta Kaavalkaaran
 1989 Karthik – Varusham Padhinaaru
 Bhagyaraj – Aararo Aariraro
 Kamal Haasan – Apoorva Sagodharargal
 Rahman – Pudhu Pudhu Arthangal
 Ramarajan – Karakattakkaran

1990s 
 1990 Karthik – Kizhakku Vaasal
 Kamal Haasan – Michael Madana Kama Rajan
 Rajinikanth – Panakkaran
 Sathyaraj – Nadigan
 Vijayakanth – Pulan Visaranai
 1991 Kamal Haasan – Gunaa
 Mammootty – Azhagan
 Murali – Idhayam
 Prabhu – Chinna Thambi
 Rajinikanth – Thalapathi
 1992 Kamal Haasan – Thevar Magan
 Arvind Swami – Roja
 Bhagyaraj – Raasukutti
 Rajinikanth – Annaamalai
 Vijayakanth – Chinna Gounder
 1993 Karthik – Ponnumani
 Arjun Sarja – Gentleman
 Kamal Haasan – Kalaignan
 Rajinikanth – Uzhaippali
 Vijayakumar – Kizhakku Cheemayile
 1994 R. Sarathkumar – Nattamai
 Kamal Haasan – Mahanadhi
 Prabhu Deva – Kadhalan
 Prabhu – Duet
 Vijayakanth – Honest Raj
 1995 Kamal Haasan – Kuruthipunal
 Ajith Kumar – Aasai
 Arvind Swami – Bombay
 Rajinikanth – Baashha
 Rajinikanth – Muthu
 1996 Kamal Haasan – Indian
 Ajith Kumar – Kadhal Kottai
 Vijayakumar – Anthimanthaarai
 1997 R. Sarathkumar – Suryavamsam
 Prakash Raj – Iruvar
 R. Parthiban – Bharathi Kannamma
 Rajinikanth – Arunachalam
 Vijay – Kadhalukku Mariyadhai
 1998 R. Sarathkumar – Natpukkaga
 Karthik – Unnidathil Ennai Koduthen
 Prashanth – Jeans
 1999 Ajith Kumar – Vaali
 Ajith Kumar – Amarkalam
 Arjun Sarja – Mudhalvan
 Rajinikanth – Padayappa
 Vikram – Sethu

2000s 
 2000 Kamal Haasan – Hey Ram
 Ajith Kumar – Mugavaree
 Madhavan – Alaipayuthey
 Prashanth – Parthen Rasithen
 Sayaji Shinde – Bharathi
 2001 Vikram – Kasi
 Ajith Kumar – Citizen
 Ajith Kumar – Poovellam Un Vasam
 Kamal Haasan – Aalavandhan
 Suriya – Nandha
 2002 Ajith Kumar – Villain
 Kamal Haasan – Panchatanthiram
 Madhavan – Kannathil Muthamittal
 Suriya – Mounam Pesiyadhe
 2003 Vikram – Pithamagan
 Dhanush – Kadhal Kondein
 Kamal Haasan – Anbe Sivam
 Suriya – Kaakha Kaakha
 2004 Suriya – Perazhagan
 Kamal Haasan – Vasool Raja MBBS
 Silambarasan – Manmadhan
 Vijay – Ghilli
 2005 Vikram – Anniyan
 Jiiva – Raam
 Sarath Kumar – Ayya
 Suriya – Ghajini
 2006 Ajith Kumar – Varalaru
 Dhanush – Pudhupettai
 Kamal Haasan – Vettaiyaadu Vilaiyaadu
 Narain – Chithiram Pesuthadi
 2007 Karthi – Paruthiveeran
 Ajith Kumar – Billa
 Rajinikanth – Sivaji
 Sathyaraj – Onbathu Roopai Notu
 Vijay – Pokkiri
 2008 Suriya – Vaaranam Aayiram
 Dhanush – Yaaradi Nee Mohini
 Jayam Ravi – Santosh Subramaniam
 Kamal Haasan – Dasavathaaram
 Narain – Anjathe
 2009 Prakash Raj – Kanchivaram
 Arya – Naan Kadavul
 Jayam Ravi – Peranmai
 Kamal Haasan – Unnaipol Oruvan
 Suriya – Ayan

2010s 
 2010 – Vikram – Raavanan
 Arya – Madrasapattinam
 Karthi – Aayirathil Oruvan
 Karthi – Paiyaa
 Rajinikanth – Enthiran
 Silambarasan – Vinnaithaandi Varuvaayaa
 Suriya – Singam
 2011 – Dhanush – Aadukalam
 Ajith Kumar – Mankatha
 Jiiva – Ko
 Suriya – 7aum Arivu
 Vikram – Deiva Thirumagal
 2012 – Dhanush – 3
 Suriya – Maattrraan
 Vijay – Thuppakki
 Vijay Sethupathi – Pizza
 Vikram – Thandavam
 2013 – Atharvaa – Paradesi
 Ajith Kumar – Arrambam
 Dhanush – Maryan
 Kamal Haasan – Vishwaroopam
 Kishore – Haridas
 Suriya – Singam 2
 2014 – Dhanush – Velaiilla Pattadhari
 Ajith Kumar – Veeram
 Karthi – Madras
 Siddharth – Kaaviya Thalaivan
 Vijay – Kaththi
 2015 – Vikram – I
 Ajith Kumar – Yennai Arindhaal
 Dhanush – Anegan
 Jayam Ravi – Thani Oruvan
 Kamal Haasan – Papanasam
 2016 – Madhavan – Irudhi Suttru
 Dhanush – Kodi
 Rajinikanth – Kabali
 Suriya –  24
 Vijay – Theri
 Vikram – Iru Mugan
 2017 – Vijay Sethupathi – Vikram Vedha
 Karthi – Theeran Adhigaaram Ondru
 Madhavan – Vikram Vedha
 Rajkiran – Power Paandi
 Vijay – Mersal
 2018 – Dhanush – Vada Chennai and Vijay Sethupathi – 96 (tie) Arvind Swami – Chekka Chivantha Vaanam
 Jayam Ravi – Adanga Maru
 Vijay – Sarkar
 2020–2021 – Suriya – Soorarai Pottru
 Arvind Swami –  Thalaivi
 Arya – Sarpatta Parambarai
 Ashok Selvan – Oh My Kadavule
 Dhanush – Karnan
 Dulquer Salman – Kannum Kannum Kollaiyadithaal
 K. Manikandan – Jai Bhim 
 Suriya – Jai Bhim

References

Bibliography 
 
 
 

Actor